Helvetica is a typeface developed in 1957.

It can also refer to:

Helvetica (film), a documentary about the typeface
Helvetic Republic, a Swiss state existing from 1798 to 1803
Confoederatio Helvetica, the Latin name for Switzerland

See also
Helvetic (disambiguation)
Helvetia (disambiguation)
Switzerland in the Roman era